United Nations Square is a public square in the center of Casablanca, Morocco. It has been central in the history of Casablanca.

History 

In 1908, after the French bombardment and invasion of Casablanca, the French commander Charles Martial Joseph Dessigny ordered the construction of a clock tower in the area, which then took the name, Place de l'Horloge, "Square of the Clock". The square was then named Place de France, "Square of France," and the surrounding area was developed by a team of French architects and urban planners chosen by the French Résident général Hubert Lyautey and led by Henri Prost.

The  Hotel Excelsior, which remains today, was built in 1916.

As the European , or "new city," expended eastward of the square, the square evolved from a marketplace to a contact point between the European city and the Casablanca medina, which French colonists described as the "."

The square became a bus station for a period of time in the midcentury. A clock tower imitating the original's design was constructed a short distance closer to the medina in 1993.

The architect Jean-François Zevaco designed the Kora Ardia, "Globe," in 1975.

The Casablanca Tramway transformed the square. Work started in 2009, and the first line was inaugurated December 12, 2012.

Access 
The square is reachable by Line 1 of the Tramway, which stops at United Nations Square Station.

See also 
 Casablanca Clock Tower
 Medina of Casablanca

References 

Casablanca
All stub articles
Coordinates on Wikidata
Squares in Morocco